Thomas Pattinson Dick (1903–1979), was a male English badminton international.

Badminton career
Dick born in Gosforth  competed in the All England Open Badminton Championships where he was a three times finalist. He represented England, Northumberland and Cheshire.

He won three Scottish Open, nine Welsh International titles and was a significant author of badminton books.

References

English male badminton players
1903 births
1979 deaths